Myristica sangowoensis is a species of plant in the family Myristicaceae. It is a tree endemic to Maluku in Indonesia.

References

sangowoensis
Endemic flora of the Maluku Islands
Trees of the Maluku Islands
Least concern plants
Taxonomy articles created by Polbot
Taxa named by James Sinclair (botanist)